Still Life is the second studio album by American indie rock musician Kevin Morby, released on October 14, 2014 by Woodsist Records. The album's title and cover were taken from an art piece by Maynard Monrow titled "Still Life with the Rejects from the Land of Misfit Toys".

Critical reception

Still Life received wide acclaim from contemporary music critics. At Metacritic, which assigns a normalized rating out of 100 to reviews from mainstream critics, the album received an average score of 80, based on 7 reviews, which indicates "generally favorable reviews".

Track list
All songs written by Kevin Morby.

Personnel
Musicians
Kevin Morby – vocals, guitar, bass , piano 
Justin Sullivan – drums, percussion
Huw Evans - bass , backing vocals 
Will Canzoneri - organ , piano , backing vocals 
A. Conrad - baritone saxophone 
J. Santamaria - alto saxophone 
B. Sherman - trumpet 
Alex Lilly - backing vocals 

Production and artwork
Rob Barbato – producer, bass , guitar, double bass , organ , percussion , backing vocals 
Drew Fischer - engineer, mixing
Maynard Monroe – cover photography
Robbie Simon – cover layout
Amy Harrity - back cover photography
Nicole Bonneau - back cover layout
Eleanor Swordy - paintings

References

2014 albums
Kevin Morby albums
Woodsist albums